Gustavo Salcedo can refer to:

 Gustavo Salcedo (rower) (born 1982), Peruvian rower
 Gustavo Salcedo (swimmer) (born 1952), Mexican swimmer